Betaretrovirus is a genus of the Retroviridae family. It has type B or type D morphology. The type B is common for a few exogenous, vertically transmitted and endogenous viruses of mice; some primate and sheep viruses are the type D.

Examples are Mouse mammary tumor virus, enzootic nasal tumor virus (ENTV-1, ENTV-2), and simian retrovirus types 1, 2 and 3 (SRV-1, SRV-2, SRV-3).

References

External links
 Viralzone: Betaretrovirus

Betaretroviruses
Virus genera